The 2001 Indianapolis Colts season was the 49th season for the team in the National Football League and 18th in Indianapolis. The Indianapolis Colts finished the National Football League's 2001 season with a record of 6 wins and 10 losses, and finished fourth in the AFC East division. In the process the Colts allowed 486 points in sixteen games, an average of 30 points per match and the franchise worst since the  1981 Colts who allowed 533. At the time only the aforementioned Colts, the 1980 Saints and the 1966 Giants (in a 14-game schedule) had ever allowed more points. This would be the last time the Colts would miss the playoffs until 2011 and the only time in the 2000s decade in which they didn't qualify.

Offseason

NFL draft

Undrafted free agents

Personnel

Staff

Roster

Regular season

Schedule

Standings

Season summary 
The Colts suffered the second losing season of Peyton Manning's career. After opening with dominant wins over the Jets and Buffalo, the Colts were crushed twice in three games by the Patriots to go with a loss to Oakland. Two more wins followed to bring the Colts to 4–3, but they followed this up with two more losses headed into their matchup with the San Francisco 49ers at home on November 25. The 49ers entered the game having only lost twice to that point in the season, but had struggled to put up points and had barely beaten the Carolina Panthers, who would only record one win that season, the week before.

The Colts, needing the victory, instead turned the ball over five times. Manning threw four interceptions, two to Ahmed Plummer and two more to Zack Bronson including one that was returned for a touchdown. The 49ers scored 23 total points off of the five Indianapolis turnovers. Despite outgaining the 49ers, the Colts lost the game 40-21 and after the game, coach Jim Mora sharply criticized his offense's effort, especially Manning's four interceptions.

During the press conference, a reporter asked Mora a question about the Colts' playoff chances now that the team was 4–6. Mora, who had not heard what was said, asked him to repeat the question. When the question was repeated, Mora responded by dismissing the suggestion that the Colts could make the postseason in the following manner:

A few days later, Manning spoke to reporters ahead of the Colts’ next game with the defending Super Bowl champion Baltimore Ravens and sharply criticized Mora's handling of the situation. He said that he did not appreciate being called out in public like he had been and that if Mora had a problem with him he should have spoken to him directly. This caused Mora to backtrack on his previous statements, but the damage was done.

The Colts went on to finish 6-10 and Mora was fired after the season.

Manning threw 23 interceptions during the season, the highest number of his career following his rookie season. He was sacked a career-high 29 times.

See also 
 Colts–Patriots rivalry
 History of the Indianapolis Colts
 Indianapolis Colts seasons

References 

Indianapolis Colts
Indianapolis Colts seasons
Colts